Adventures of the Sea Hawk is a 1958 syndicated television series starring John Howard.

Plot
The series presents the travels of the floating electronics lab Sea Hawk as the schooner undertakes research projects in the Caribbean.  The ship is piloted by Commander John Hawk.

Cast and characters
John Howard as Commander John 'Pliny' Hawk
John Lee as Peter Seaforth, his aide
Michael Brennan as Reilly
Mary Holland as Jonesy
Hatton Duprez as Kivi

References

External links

1958 American television series debuts
1958 American television series endings
1950s American television series
American adventure television series
Black-and-white American television shows
First-run syndicated television programs in the United States